IBank, ibank, iBank, or Ibank may refer to: 

 iBank (software), a personal financial software package for Macintosh computers, made by IGG Software
 International Exchange Bank
 Investment banking, a form of banking practice
 Islamic Bank of Thailand

See also
 Ibanking (disambiguation)